Leon (D54) ("Lion") was a  destroyer that served with the Greek Navy between 1951–1992. The ship had formerly served with the United States Navy under the name , famous for its alleged role in the Philadelphia Experiment.

Service history 
Leon was transferred to Greece under the Mutual Defense Assistance Program. It was put to service in January 1951 by Vice Admiral D. Foifas. She was used mainly for patrols in the Eastern Aegean Sea and for cadet officer (midshipmen) training.

Leon was decommissioned on November 15. 1992 and later in November 1999 it was sold as scrap to the Piraeus-based V&J Scrapmetal Trading Ltd.

Sister ships
Leon belonged to a group of four Cannon-class destroyers that were transferred to the Greek Navy in 1951. The other three were Ierax (D31) ("Hawk"), Aetos (D01) ("Eagle") and Panthir (D67) ("Panther"), affectionately known as the Thiria ("Beasts").

References

Wild Beast-class destroyers (1951)
Ships built in Kearny, New Jersey
1943 ships